Warren Albert Grady (March 3, 1924 – December 14, 2019) was an American judge and politician.

Biography
Grady was born on March 3, 1924, in Port Washington, Wisconsin. He graduated from Port Washington High School in 1942. Grady also graduated from Northwestern University and the University of Wisconsin-Madison. Grady served in the United States Navy during World War II. He died on December 14, 2019, in Baraboo, Wisconsin.

Career
Grady was first elected to the Wisconsin State Assembly in 1952. He served as Majority Leader for the 1957 session. He was a Republican. Grady served as judge for Ozaukee County, Wisconsin from 1963 to 1995.

References

1924 births
2019 deaths
People from Port Washington, Wisconsin
Military personnel from Wisconsin
Wisconsin state court judges
Republican Party members of the Wisconsin State Assembly
Northwestern University alumni
University of Wisconsin–Madison alumni
20th-century American judges
United States Navy personnel of World War II